Rocknet aréna is an indoor sporting arena located in Chomutov, Czech Republic. The capacity of the arena is 5,250 people. It replaced ČEZ Stadion Chomutov as home of the ice hockey team Piráti Chomutov. The arena opened in 2012 and has a capacity of 5,250 spectators.

References

Buildings and structures in Chomutov
Indoor ice hockey venues in the Czech Republic
2012 establishments in the Czech Republic
Sports venues completed in 2012
21st-century architecture in the Czech Republic